Gustavo Adolfo Cabrera Marroquín (born 13 December 1979 in Santo Tomás, Guatemala) is a former Guatemalan football defender who last played for Deportivo Marquense in the Liga Nacional de Guatemala and was also a member of the Guatemala national team. On 12 September 2012 he was banned from play for life due to allegations of match-fixing.

Club career
Cabrera is the younger brother of former national team player Edy and both started playing football at JuCa de Izabal before moving to Guatemalan giants Comunicaciones. The brothers were separated when Edy joined Cobán Imperial.

Prior to joining Major League Soccer outfit Real Salt Lake midway through the 2005 season, Cabrera spent ten seasons with Comunicaciones in his native Guatemala and again in 2006. He is a two-footed player that has been used on the left, right and center of his team's formations and has won four Guatemalan League championships between 1998–2005 and was also named MVP of the Guatemalan league in 2003.

On 6 June 2008, it was confirmed at a local newspaper that he was being transferred to Danish Superliga club AGF Aarhus. Cabrera left CSD Comunicaciones on a free transfer following a contract dispute with the club in which three players from the national team filed for free agency with the football federation since the club was in arrears for over three months of salary obligations. He was released from his AGF contract on 28 November 2008. The club said that they liked him, and that he had adapted well into the team, but he did not fit into the Scandinavian style of play. He never got to play on the first team.

Cabrera returned to his native Guatemala and signed a six-month contract with C.D. Jalapa on 11 January 2009 to play for them during the 2009 Clausura. He subsequently moved on to Xelaju.

Match fixing allegations and suspension
Cabrera, along with Guillermo Ramirez and Yony Flores were found guilty by the National Football Federation of Guatemala in September 2012 of conspiring to fix a pair of national team exhibitions and a CONCACAF Champions League game between CSD Municipal and Mexico's Santos Laguna. The trio played together at Municipal in the fall of 2010, when the club finished behind Santos and the Columbus Crew in its first-round group.

Banned from the sport inside their native country, the players saw their exile extended worldwide on Wednesday.

International career
He has been a regular member of the Guatemalan national team since 2000, participating in the 2002, 2006, 2010, and 2014 World Cup qualifying processes. He made his debut against Belize and has since collected 100 caps as of 12 November 2011, which makes him the second-most capped player ever for Guatemala. Cabrera has also been the captain of the national team often throughout 2007 including wearing the captain's armband for the nation's 3–2 victory over Mexico. On 27 May 2012, Cabrera was separated from the Guatemala National Team on basis of suspected " to arrange a match's result of Guatemala against Sudafrica on 2010 " as well as other arrangements which led to the defeat of his clubs at different opportunities. In June 2012, this was confirmed by a teammates, Luis Rodriguez and Carlos Ruiz. Currently Ramires is under FIFA investigation as well as by the Ministerio Publico of Guatemala for Treason, Money laundering and other accounts.

International goals

Honours
Comunicaciones 
Liga Nacional de Guatemala: Clausura 2001, Apertura 2002, Clausura 2003

Jalapa
Liga Nacional de Guatemala: Clausura 2009

See also
 List of men's footballers with 100 or more international caps

References

External links
 
 
 Player profile  – Xelaju MC

1979 births
Living people
People from Izabal Department
Guatemalan footballers
Guatemalan expatriate footballers
Guatemala international footballers
2001 UNCAF Nations Cup players
2002 CONCACAF Gold Cup players
2005 UNCAF Nations Cup players
2005 CONCACAF Gold Cup players
2007 UNCAF Nations Cup players
2007 CONCACAF Gold Cup players
2011 Copa Centroamericana players
2011 CONCACAF Gold Cup players
Comunicaciones F.C. players
Real Salt Lake players
Aarhus Gymnastikforening players
Xelajú MC players
Expatriate soccer players in the United States
Expatriate men's footballers in Denmark
FIFA Century Club
Major League Soccer players
Sportspeople banned for life
Sportspeople involved in betting scandals
Copa Centroamericana-winning players
Association football defenders